Caroline Chariot-Dayez (born Brussels, 11 September 1958) is a Belgian hyperrealistic painter.

Although interested in painting from a very early age, she studied philosophy in order to understand what painting is. She was deeply influenced by the French phenomenologist Maurice Merleau-Ponty, who wrote extensively on perception, vision, embodiment, and painting.

Her life has been an ongoing interaction between philosophy, which she teaches, and painting. Until the age of forty, she was reluctant to show her paintings in public (with the exception of an appearance on the Belgian Broadcasting Corporation programme "The Arts at Large" in 1995).

She lives and works in Brussels.

Exhibitions
 March 1999 - Galerie Elian Lisart - Brussels
 November 2000 - Galerie Tempera - Brussels (Place Royale-Koningsplein)
 December 2000 - Linéart - Ghent
 February 2001 - Galerie Brûlée - Strasbourg
 March–August 2001 - Galerie Tempera - Brussels (Place Royale-Koningsplein)
 2002 - Galerie Brulée, Strasbourg
 2002 - Galerie Arcadia, Lille, 2002
 2003 - Collins and Hastie Gallery, London
 2005 - Galerie Visconti, Paris
 April 2006 - Lars Bolander, New York City  "The Fold" 
 2007 - Tessenderloo Group, Brussels
 March–April 2009 - Cathedral of Brussels, Brussels

Bibliography
"Caroline Chariot-Dayez", Editions Art in Belgium, Lasne, 2005.

References

External links
Home page
Caroline Chariot-Dayez, Review Painting
"Caroline Chariot-Dayez", Daily Motion

1958 births
Living people
Artists from Brussels
Belgian women painters
20th-century Belgian women artists
20th-century Belgian painters
21st-century Belgian painters
21st-century Belgian women artists